Conrad Fetherstonhaugh Harrington  (1912 – May 12, 2000) was a Canadian lawyer, businessman, and Chancellor of McGill University from 1976 to 1983.

Life and career
Born in Montreal, Quebec, he was educated at Selwyn House School and Trinity College School in Port Hope, Ontario. He received his Bachelor of Arts degree in 1933, and his Bachelor of Civil Law degree in 1936 from McGill University. He was a member of Zeta Psi. He was called to the Quebec Bar in 1936. After spending a year studying in France, he practiced law in Montreal.

From 1940 to 1945, he fought in World War II with the Royal Canadian Artillery. After the war, he joined the Royal Trust Company, becoming Executive Vice-President in 1964. In 1965, he was elected to the board of directors of the Royal Trust Company of Canada.

In 1984, he was awarded an honorary LLD from McGill University. In 1986, he was made a Member of the Order of Canada.

References

External links
 

1912 births
2000 deaths
Canadian military personnel of World War II
Lawyers in Quebec
Chancellors of McGill University
Members of the Order of Canada
McGill University alumni
Businesspeople from Montreal
Anglophone Quebec people
20th-century Canadian lawyers
McGill University Faculty of Law alumni
20th-century Canadian businesspeople